Lake Ngardok is a lake on the Palauan island of Babeldaob, in the State of Melekeok. It is the largest natural freshwater lake in all of the islands of Micronesia. The lake and the marshes surrounding it are a refuge for the endangered saltwater crocodile (ius), and it is an important breeding location for them. The Ngerdorch River serves as a route that connects crocodiles with the sea. The lake is approximately 493 hectares with an ecosystem that provides a habitat for plants, wildlife, and birds, some of which are found only in the Palau Islands. These include the endemic Palau fruit dove (biib), Palau fantail (melimdelebdeb), Micronesian imperial-pigeon (belochel), common moorhens and Pacific black ducks (both called debar), Palau flycatcher (charmelachull), and a fruit bat species (olik).
The Chief Council of Melekeok State has established the Ngardok Nature Reserve to protect the watershed's slow degradation process, because the importance of the forests are critical to preserving the water quality in the lake. The lake however will soon be established as a reservoir for Ngerulmud, Palau's new national capital in Melekeok.

References

Ngardok
Melekeok
Ramsar sites in Palau
Ngerulmud